This is an overview of taxes charged to individuals and companies in Namibia.

Income Tax
Personal income tax is applicable to total taxable income of an Individual and all individuals are taxed at progressive marginal rates over a series of income brackets. The tax year runs from 1 March to 28 February.

Tax rates for the 2010–2011 to 2012–2013 tax years were as follows:

Tax rates proposed for the 2016–2018

tax year are as follows:

Income tax is typically withheld by the employer.

Individuals are responsible for submitting a tax return form to the Receiver of Revenue once a year. Individual taxpayers are categorised into three groups each submitting a different colour tax return. There are brown, blue and yellow forms.

Value Added Tax
A 15% Value added tax (VAT) is applicable to almost every commodity. Basic commodities like sugar, bread etc. are exempted from VAT.

See also
 Cost of Living in Namibia
 Economy of Namibia

References

Economy of Namibia